2021 in cycling included the following:

2021 in men's road cycling
2021 in women's road cycling